West View can refer to:

Places

England
 West View, County Durham, England

United States
Cities, towns, etc.
 West View, New Jersey
 West View, Pennsylvania
 West View, Milwaukee, Wisconsin
Places on the National Register of Historic Places:
 West View (Zanesville, Ohio)

Ships
 , also spelled Westview, a United States Navy cargo ship in commission from 1918 to 1919

See also
 Westview (disambiguation)